The Renmin Business School  (simplified Chinese: 人民商学院),( Pinyin: Rénmín shāng xuéyuàn), was founded in 1950 and is a major and the most prestigious business school in China. Renmin Business School (RBS) is the leading school of the prestigious Renmin University of China, a project 211, project 985, and a double first-class University. RBS is also considered the most selective and essential base for business administration education in China, accepting only the top 0.1% of applicants from each province in the country. Renmin Business school of China is considered one of the top 50 business schools globally by the Financial Times. The predecessor of the Renmin Business School was the Department of Factory Management, Trade, Bookkeeping, and Financial Credit. Renmin Business School is the founder of business administration education in China.

After more than 70 years of development, the college has trained a large number of talents in the field of economics and management for enterprises and government agencies. Renmin Business School has also trained a large number of teachers for Chinese universities, opened many new education programs, and opened up many new research fields. RBS actively contributes to government decision-making and enterprise development and is an essential pioneer of Chinese management education.

The school has 139 full-time faculty members, including 47 professors, 52 associate professors, and 40 assistant professors/lecturers. Close to 20% of the faculty were trained overseas with a doctoral degree. The faculty are leaders in their respective academic fields and winners of Teaching Excellence. They are senior consultants or independent directors of boards of some of the largest companies in China. In recent years, RBS has strengthened its efforts in internationalization by significantly boosting its international programs.

In the most recent evaluation by the Ministry of Education of the PRC, RBS was ranked number one for its excellence in Business administration. The school is among the few in China that has three nationally designated key research disciplines: general management, industrial economics, and accounting. RBS faculty won 19 national research grants in 2008.

Ranking and Accreditations 

In recent years, the business school has vigorously promoted its internationalization strategy and passed EQUIS and AACSB certifications in 2010 and 2013, becoming one of the first business schools in mainland China to obtain two top global management education certifications. At present, the school's MBA program, EMBA program, and executive education (EE) program have all entered the top 50 worldwide, ranked by the Financial Times as 38th, 43rd, and 11th, respectively. In 2017, RBS was rated A+ (the highest level) in the fourth round of first-level discipline evaluation. In addition, later in the year, the Business Administration discipline of the Renmin University of China was selected into the "world-class disciplines" list by the Chinese Ministry of Education.

International collaborations 

Renmin business school has established long-term and close personnel exchanges relations with more than 80 famous universities in the United States, Canada, the United Kingdom, Denmark, Ireland, Finland, France, Japan, South Korea, Australia, Belgium, the Netherlands, and other countries, as well as in Hong Kong and Taiwan. Renmin Business School actively collaborates with its international partners to improve global management education. RBS is also one of the founding members of the Global Network for advanced management, along with the Yale school of management. In addition, the University has established partnerships such as student exchange and academic exchange with Universities worldwide.

International MBA (IMBA) Program
In 2009 RBS launched IMBA program. The IMBA program requires students to finish 47 credits, a practice report, and a thesis. Students who complete all requirements will be awarded an MBA degree by RUC.

The IMBA students from overseas and China take classes together. All the core courses are taught in English, and certain elective courses are taught in English or bilingually. Popular American and European textbooks are used in combination with real-world insights into the Chinese business environment. Lessons are given by professors with experience at RBS and at overseas business schools. RBS has established long-term partnerships with many business schools worldwide.

References

External links
 Renmin University of China website

Universities and colleges in China
Renmin University of China